Germond is a surname. Notable people with the surname include:

Anne Germond (born 1960), Anglican bishop
Brian Germond, Anglican bishop
Jack Germond (1928–2013), American journalist and writer

See also
Germon
Warmund, Patriarch of Jerusalem